This was the first WTA edition of the tournament; the previous editions were ITF events.

Anna-Lena Grönefeld was the defending champion from 2003, but lost in the second round to Sessil Karatantcheva.

Nicole Vaidišová won the title, defeating Laura Granville in the final. At 15 years and 3 months of age, Vaidišová became the 6th youngest woman to win a Pro-level title, and the youngest since 1997.

Seeds

Draw

Finals

Top half

Bottom half

Qualifying

Seeds

Qualifiers

Qualifying draw

First qualifier

Second qualifier

Third qualifier

Fourth qualifier

References

External links 
 Draws in WTA archive
 All draws on the ITF website
 Results dispalyed on Tennis Quickfound

2004 WTA Tour
Vancouver Open